The 2018 Sacred Heart Pioneers football team represented Sacred Heart University in the 2018 NCAA Division I FCS football season. They were led by sixth-year head coach Mark Nofri and played their home games at Campus Field. They were a member of the Northeast Conference. They finished the season 7–4, 5–1 in NEC play to be NEC co-champions with Duquesne. Due to their head-to-head loss to Duquesne, they did not receive the NEC's automatic bid to the FCS Playoffs and did not receive and at-large bid.

Previous season
The Pioneers finished the 2017 season 4–7, 2–4 in NEC play to finish in a tie for fifth place.

Preseason

NEC coaches poll
The NEC released their preseason coaches poll on July 24, 2018, with the Pioneers predicted to finish in sixth place. They did not place any players on the preseason all-NEC team.

Schedule

Source: Schedule

Game summaries

Lafayette

at Bucknell

at Wagner

at Cornell

Penn

at Dartmouth

at Central Connecticut

Bryant

Robert Morris

at Duquesne

Saint Francis (PA)

References

Sacred Heart
Sacred Heart Pioneers football seasons
Northeast Conference football champion seasons
Sacred Heart Pioneers football